Tetrahalomethanes are fully halogenated methane derivatives of general formula CBrkCllFmInAtp, where:Tetrahalomethanes are on the border of inorganic and organic chemistry, thus they can be assigned both inorganic and organic names by IUPAC: tetrafluoromethane - carbon tetrafluoride, tetraiodomethane - carbon tetraiodide, dichlorodifluoromethane - carbon dichloride difluoride.

Each halogen (F, Cl, Br, I, At) forms a corresponding halomethane, but their stability decreases in order CF4 > CH4 > CCl4 > CBr4 > CI4 from exceptionally stable gaseous tetrafluoromethane with bond energy 515 kJ·mol−1 to solid tetraiodomethane, depending on bond energy.

Many mixed halomethanes are also known, such as CBrClF2.

Uses 
Fluorine, chlorine, and sometimes bromine-substituted halomethanes were used as refrigerants, commonly known as CFCs (chlorofluorocarbons).

See also 
 Monohalomethane
 Dihalomethane
 Trihalomethane

Inorganic carbon compounds
Nonmetal halides
Halomethanes